Andorra is a tourist destination in Europe. Andorra has several major ski resorts, including Soldeu/El Tarter and Pal/Arinsal. These are very popular with tourists from Spain, France and the United Kingdom, particularly because their relatively gentle slopes are ideal for less experienced people as well as families. Andorran ski schools are among the largest in Europe. Because it is not a member of the European Union, Andorra is able to sell a wide range of duty-free products, including alcohol, perfume and cigarettes.  These are much cheaper than in neighboring countries, and are a lucrative source of revenue for the country. Andorra also has many hiking trails which can be explored during the summer months, when the snow has thawed.

A 2008 source asserts 10.2 million visitors.

References

External links 

 

 
Andorra